Once Upon a Time Was I, Verônica is a 2012 Brazilian drama film directed and written by Marcelo Gomes. At the 45th Festival de Brasília it shared the Best Film Award with They'll Come Back, and won Best Supporting Actor (W. J Solha), Best Screenplay, Best Cinematography and Best Score.

Plot
Veronica, a newly graduated medical student, goes through a moment of reflection and doubt. She questions not only her professional choices, but also her intimate relationships and even her ability to cope with life.

Cast
Hermila Guedes as Verônica
João Miguel as Gustavo
W. J Solha as Zé Maria
Renata Roberta as Maria
Inaê Veríssimo as Ciça
Maeve Jinkings

Production
Director Marcelo Gomes revealed the sex scene between João Miguel and Hermila Guedes is unsimulated.

References

External links
    
 

2012 drama films
2012 films
Brazilian drama films
Films directed by Marcelo Gomes
Films shot in Recife